Neptis rivularis, the Hungarian glider, is a species of butterfly in the family Nymphalidae.

It lives in Central and Eastern Europe, Russia, central Asia and the Far East as far as Japan. The breadth of its wings is 25–27 mm. It prefers forest habitats, and its caterpillars feed on Spiraea.

References

rivularis
Butterflies described in 1763
Butterflies of Europe
Butterflies of Asia
Taxa named by Giovanni Antonio Scopoli